The Gold Key is  1985 American direct-to-video film. It was Ray Milland's final film role.

Production
The film sold 20,000 outlets across the country in 1995. The viewers submitted the first correct entry by January and won $100,000. It was set in Chicago. Milland said: "They didn't give me a full script, and they shot other scenes outside of the scene I was in. I don't know what this is all about."

References

External links
The Gold Key at IMDb
The Gold Key at BFI

1985 films